Morgan Stewart's Coming Home is a 1987 American comedy film starring Jon Cryer, Viveka Davis, Paul Gleason, Nicholas Pryor and Lynn Redgrave. The screenplay was written by Ken Hixon and David N. Titcher. The film was also released as Home Front and Homefront Riviera in some countries. The film was directed by Paul Aaron/Terry Winsor, but upon release the director was listed as "Alan Smithee", a name often used when directors ask to remove their names from a picture.

Plot
The film stars Cryer as Morgan Stewart, the son of a Republican senator from Virginia who has spent most of his life away at boarding school. An eccentric boy who is a fan of horror films and school dances, his personality does not fit in with the carefully calculated conservative image his mother (Redgrave) has designed for their family. He is brought home to help with his father's campaign for re-election as Senator, and immediately butts heads with his parents, refusing to be the "Cardboard Cutout" they demand. Threatened with military school, Morgan discovers that his top advisors are setting the family up to take the fall for their crimes. With the help of a zany new girlfriend (Davis) he manages to save the day, and loosen up his family in the process.

Production
The film was made in 1985 under the title Home Front directed by Terry Winsor. Four weeks after filming started, Winsor was fired. He was replaced by Paul Aaron but neither received credit on the film.

Film locations
 6th Street and Pennsylvania Avenue, SE
 Lincoln Memorial—east side
 Riggs Bank—Lafayette Park
 Rock Creek Parkway
 Washington Monument
 White House—North Side
 Charlottesville, Virginia—Downtown Mall & Fashion Square Mall
 Richmond, Virginia—The University of Richmond campus
 Miller School of Albemarle, Crozet Virginia

Soundtrack
The soundtrack included the opening track 'Painted Moon' by The Silencers and music by Peter Bernstein, Timothy Duckworth, Bernard Herrmann, Chris Isaak, John Manikoff, and The Surfaris.

Critical reception
Critics generally felt the film to be poor, although the cast, especially Jon Cryer, was usually praised.  The New York Times noted that "It's hard to imagine any adult sitting through this movie without dozing off or cracking up, but it's a harmless enough fantasy, and if Jon Cryer's career takes off -- he's due in at least two more films, Dudes and Superman IV -- Morgan Stewart may find a place in the archives as an early little movie in which the star wasn't nearly matched by the material."

Rob Lowing of The Sydney Morning Herald wrote of the film "there are three good reasons to see it.  However, these don't include the direction, storyline or soundtrack."  She was particularly critical of the direction:  "Director Smithee should cop most of the blame...a camera which wanders all over the place, a totally bland soundtrack, and fussy repetition of ideas..." Conversely, Lowing singled out actors Paul Gleason, Lynn Redgrave and Jon Cryer as the three central attractions of the film, noting that "there are flashes of brilliance, though, particularly when Cryer and Redgrave are left alone to strut their stuff."

References

External links

 
 
 
 New York Times review

1987 films
1987 independent films
1980s teen comedy films
American independent films
American political comedy films
American teen comedy films
Films about elections
Films credited to Alan Smithee
Films set in Virginia
Films set in Washington, D.C.
Films shot in Virginia
Films shot in Washington, D.C.
1980s English-language films
Films directed by Terry Winsor
1980s American films